Erich Oswald Hans Carl Maria von Stroheim (born Erich Oswald Stroheim; September 22, 1885 – May 12, 1957) was an Austrian-American director, screenwriter, actor, and producer, most noted as a film star and avant-garde, visionary director of the silent era. His 1924 film Greed (an adaptation of Frank Norris's 1899 novel McTeague) is considered one of the finest and most important films ever made. After clashes with Hollywood studio bosses over budget and workers' rights problems, Stroheim found it difficult to find work as a director and subsequently became a well-respected character actor, particularly in French cinema.

For his early innovations as a director, Stroheim is still celebrated as one of the first of the auteur directors. He helped introduce more sophisticated plots and nourish sexual and psychological undercurrents into cinema. He died of prostate cancer in France in 1957, at the age of 71. Beloved by Parisian neo-Surrealists known as Letterists, he was honored by Letterist Maurice Lemaître with a 70-minute 1979 film titled Erich von Stroheim.

Background and personal life
Stroheim was born in Vienna, Austria in 1885 as Erich Oswald Stroheim (some sources give Hans Erich Maria Stroheim von Nordenwall, but this seems to have been an assumed name, see below), the son of Benno Stroheim, a middle-class hatmaker, and Johanna Bondy, both of whom were observant Jews.

On arrival at Ellis Island, he claimed to be Count Erich Oswald Hans Carl Maria von Stroheim und Nordenwall, the son of Austrian nobility like the characters he would go on to play in his films. However, he first found work as a traveling salesman – work which took him to San Francisco and then Hollywood.

Both Billy Wilder and Stroheim's agent Paul Kohner claimed that he spoke with a decidedly lower-class Austrian accent. His years in America seem to have affected his speech, though. In The Great Gabbo, Stroheim's German, though fluid, has Midwestern American r'''s. Later, while living in Europe, Stroheim claimed in published remarks to have "forgotten" his native tongue. In Renoir's movie La Grande Illusion, Stroheim speaks German with what seems to be an American accent. Similarly, in his French-speaking roles, von Stroheim speaks with a noticeable American accent. Jean Renoir writes in his memoirs: "Stroheim spoke hardly any German. He had to study his lines like a schoolboy learning a foreign language."

However, the fashion photographer Helmut Newton, whose first language was German, used a clip from a Stroheim film on which to base one of his fantasy nude photographs, and he has commented that in the clip Stroheim speaks "a very special kind of Prussian officer lingo – it's very abrupt: it's very, very funny".

Stroheim was married three times. He was married to Margaret Knox from 1913 to 1915; His second marriage was to Mae Jones from 1916 to 1919. He was never divorced from his third wife Valerie Germonprez, though he lived with actress Denise Vernac, from 1939 until his death. Vernac also starred with him in several films. Two of Stroheim's sons eventually joined the film business: Erich Jr. (1916–1968) as an assistant director and Josef (1922–2002) as a sound editor.

After appearing in 1950's Sunset Boulevard, Stroheim moved to France where he spent the last part of his life. There his silent film work was much admired by artists in the French film industry. In France he acted in films, wrote several novels that were published in French, and worked on various unrealized film projects. He was awarded the French Legion of Honour shortly before his death.

In 1956, Stroheim began to suffer severe back pain that was diagnosed as prostate cancer. He eventually became paralyzed and was carried to his drawing room to receive the Legion of Honor award from an official delegation. He died at his chateau in Maurepas near Paris on May 12, 1957, at age 71, accompanied by his longtime lover Denise Vernac.

Film career
By 1914, he was working in Hollywood. He began working in movies as a stuntman, and then in bit-parts and as a consultant on German culture and fashion. His first film, in 1915, was The Country Boy, in which he was uncredited. His first credited role came in Old Heidelberg.

He began working with D. W. Griffith, taking an uncredited role as a Pharisee in Intolerance. Additionally, Stroheim acted as one of the many assistant directors on Intolerance, a film remembered in part for its huge cast of extras. Later, with America's entry into World War I, he played sneering German villains in such films as Sylvia of the Secret Service and The Hun Within. In The Heart of Humanity, he tears the buttons from a nurse's uniform with his teeth, and when disturbed by a crying baby, throws it out of a window.

Following the end of the war, Stroheim turned to writing and then directed his own script for Blind Husbands in 1919. He also starred in the film. As a director, Stroheim was known to be dictatorial and demanding, often antagonizing his actors. He is considered one of the greatest directors of the silent era, creating films that represent cynical and romantic views of human nature. (In the 1932 film The Lost Squadron Stroheim played a parody of himself as a fanatic German film director making a World War I movie who orders extras playing dead soldiers to "Stay dead!") Recurring tropes in his films include the portrayal of janitors, and the depiction of characters with physical disabilities.

His next directorial efforts were the lost film The Devil's Pass Key (1919) and Foolish Wives (1922), in which he also starred. Studio publicity for Foolish Wives claimed that it was the first film to cost $1 million.

In 1923, Stroheim began work on Merry-Go-Round. He cast the American actor Norman Kerry as Count Franz Maximilian von Hohenegg, a part written for himself, and newcomer Mary Philbin in the lead actress role. However studio executive Irving Thalberg fired Stroheim during filming and replaced him with director Rupert Julian.

Probably Stroheim's best remembered work as a director is Greed, a detailed filming of the novel McTeague by Frank Norris. He originally started it as a project with Samuel Goldwyn's Goldwyn Pictures. Stroheim had long wanted to do a film version of the book. He originally intended it to be a highly detailed reproduction of the original, shot mostly at the locations described in the book in San Francisco and Death Valley. Von Stroheim shot in San Francisco with his actors in period dress and silent movie makeup while the city itself was represented in its modern form. Automobiles can be seen in the background of some scenes and any "extras" or passersby are in (what was for the time) modern clothing. When the production did move to Death Valley it was in the middle of summer. Greed is also considered by some film historians to be the first feature-length film shot on location. The original print ran for an astonishing 10 hours. Knowing this version was far too long, Stroheim cut almost half the footage, reducing it to a six-hour version to be shown over two nights. It still was deemed too long, so Stroheim and director Rex Ingram edited it into a four-hour version that could be shown in two parts.

However, in the midst of filming, Goldwyn Pictures was bought by Marcus Loew and merged into Metro-Goldwyn-Mayer. After rejecting Stroheim's attempts to cut it to less than three hours, MGM removed Greed from his control and gave it to head scriptwriter June Mathis, with orders to cut it to a manageable length. Mathis gave the print to a cutter, who reduced it to 2.5 hours. 
The shortened release version was a box-office failure, and was angrily disowned by Stroheim. In particular, he blamed Mathis for destroying his pet project, since she was credited as a writer due to contractual obligations. However, Mathis had worked with Stroheim before and had long admired him, so it is not likely she would have indiscriminately butchered his film. The film was partially reconstructed in 1999 by producer Rick Schmidlin, using the existing footage mixed with surviving still photographs, but the original cut of Greed has passed into cinema lore as a lost masterpiece.

Stroheim followed with a commercial project, The Merry Widow (his most commercially successful film) and the more personal The Wedding March and the now-lost The Honeymoon.

Stroheim's unwillingness or inability to modify his artistic principles for the commercial cinema, his extreme attention to detail, his insistence on near-total artistic freedom and the resulting costs of his films led to fights with the studios. As time went on, he received fewer directing opportunities.

In 1929, Stroheim was dismissed as the director of the film Queen Kelly after disagreements with star Gloria Swanson and producer and financier Joseph P. Kennedy over the mounting costs of the film and Stroheim's introduction of indecent subject matter into the film's scenario.

After Queen Kelly and Walking Down Broadway, a project from which Stroheim was also dismissed, Stroheim returned to working principally as an actor, in both American and French films.

His stern nature, as well as some of his villainous roles, earned him the nickname "the man you love to hate".

Working in France on the eve of World War II, Stroheim was prepared to direct the film La dame blanche from his own story and screenplay. Jean Renoir wrote the dialogue, Jacques Becker was to be assistant director and Stroheim himself, Louis Jouvet and Jean-Louis Barrault were to be the featured actors. Max Cossvan was to produce the film for Demo-Film. The production was prevented by the outbreak of the war on September 1, 1939, and Stroheim returned to the United States.

Stroheim is perhaps best known as an actor for his role as Rauffenstein in Jean Renoir's La Grande Illusion (1937) and as Max von Mayerling in Billy Wilder's Sunset Boulevard (1950). For the latter film, which costarred Gloria Swanson, Stroheim was nominated for the Academy Award for Best Supporting Actor. Excerpts from Queen Kelly were used in the film. The Mayerling character states that he used to be one of the three great directors of the silent era, along with D. W. Griffith and Cecil B. DeMille; many film critics agree that Stroheim was indeed one of the great early directors. Stroheim's character in Sunset Boulevard thus had an autobiographical basis that reflected the humiliations suffered through his career.

He appeared as a guest star in the 1953 anthology drama television series Orient Express in the episode titled The Man of Many Skins''.

Filmography

As director

As actor

As contributor

Quotes

"Lubitsch shows you first the king on the throne, then as he is in the bedroom. I show you the king in the bedroom so you'll know just what he is when you see him on his throne."

"If you live in France, for instance, and you have written one good book, or painted one good picture, or directed one outstanding film 50 years ago and nothing else since, you are still recognized and honored accordingly. People take their hats off to you and call you 'maître'. They do not forget. In Hollywood—in Hollywood, you're as good as your last picture. If you didn't have one in production within the last three months, you're forgotten, no matter what you have achieved ere this."

See also
 List of German-speaking Academy Award winners and nominees

References

External links

The Stroheim Wing
The Great Gabbo (Portrait of Erich)

The Films of Erich von Stroheim, ToxicUniverse.com article by Dan Callahan
Blind Biographers: The Invention of Erich von Stroheim
Stroheim's Review of Citizen Kane, June 1941
Bibliography

1885 births
1957 deaths
Austrian Jews
Austrian male film actors
American people of Austrian-Jewish descent
American male film actors
American male silent film actors
American film directors
Jewish American male actors
Austrian Roman Catholics
German-language film directors
Converts to Roman Catholicism from Judaism
Male actors from Vienna
English-language film directors
Deaths from cancer in France
20th-century American male actors
20th-century Austrian male actors
Austro-Hungarian emigrants to the United States
Deaths from prostate cancer